The 76 mm mountain gun M1938 (Russian: 76-мм горная пушка обр. 1938 г.) was a Soviet gun used in World War II.

In 1937, USSR got a license for Skoda 75 mm M1936 mountain gun in exchange for license production of Tupolev SB in Czechoslovakia; subsequently, in 1937-1938 a team led by L. I. Gorlitskiy at Plant no 7 developed a modification eventually adopted as 76 mm mountain gun M1938.

The gun had high elevation angle and could be quickly dismantled for transporting by pack horses. Sprung wheels allowed high towing speed. The gun was light enough to be moved in combat by its crew.

By 1 June 1941, the Red Army possessed about 1068 pieces. In addition to mountain units, the weapon was issued to some airborne units.

In Wehrmacht service the gun was designated as 7.62 cm GebK 307(r). 3.1944 21. 16 on west and 5 on ost.
The Finnish army operated five captured pieces, known as 76 VK 38.

References

 Chamberlain, Peter & Gander, Terry. Infantry, Mountain and Airborne Guns. New York: Arco, 1975
 Gander, Terry and Chamberlain, Peter. Weapons of the Third Reich: An Encyclopedic Survey of All Small Arms, Artillery and Special Weapons of the German Land Forces 1939-1945. New York: Doubleday, 1979 
 Ivanov A. - Artillery of the USSR in Second World War - SPb Neva, 2003 (Иванов А. Артиллерия СССР во Второй Мировой войне. — СПб., Издательский дом Нева, 2003.)
 Shunkov V. N. - The Weapons of the Red Army - Mn. Harvest, 1999 (Шунков В. Н. - Оружие Красной Армии. — Мн.: Харвест, 1999.)
 Soviet Mountain Artillery at mega.km.ru

World War II mountain artillery
World War II artillery of the Soviet Union
76 mm artillery
Czechoslovakia–Soviet Union relations
Military equipment introduced in the 1930s